Rahul Kamerkar (born December 12, 1990) is an Indian lawyer and author.

Background and education 
Born and raised in Mumbai, Kamerkar passed through  Jamnabai Narsee School in Mumbai, Maharashtra. He holds  a Bachelors of Arts (B.A.) in Economics  from Mithibai College. He later studied law at Jitendra Chauhan College of Law.

Career 
Kamerkar specialises in white-collar crimes and financial disputes. He was enrolled as an advocate with the High Court of Bombay on 22 August 2015. Ever since then, he has been practicing as an advocate at the High Court of Bombay, Supreme Court of India, and Tribunals especially the NCLT Mumbai. Doing Intellectual Property, Commercial, Business, Land, Tax, and Insolvency Litigation.

In his youth, Kamerkar was involved in Indian politics as an associate with the Congress Party and had authored a book titled The Man’s Ultimate Guide to Popularity published by Hay House Publishers. He has since represented various political leaders and political parties from across the aisle in the High Court of Bombay and Supreme Court of India.

Notable cases

Bhai Jagtap v.s. Arnab Goswami
 Maharashtra Regional and Town Planning Act Amendments
 Aadhaar - Pan Linking
 Jet Airways Resolution Process
 Validity of Section 36(4) of The Industrial Disputes Act
 Lawyers Collective, Indira Jaising, and Anand Grover
 Right to Protest in Mumbai
 Bharat Petroleum All India Strike Matter
 Permanency of employment for 2700 Sanitation Workers
 Lakhan Bhaiya Fake Encounter Case
 General Motors India Closure Settlement Case
 Right of Workmen to Cancel Recognition of Union
 Congress Party and Political Matters
 Maharashtra Fishermen v.s. Commercial Trawling
 T.B. Drugs Patents Case (Compulsory Licensing of Bedaquiline & Delamanid)
 Shapoorji Pallonji Group - Pledging of Tata Shares
 Invesco vs ZEEL, Punit Goenka
 Antrix vs. Devas
 Future-Amazon-Reliance Dispute
 Tata Motors Case

Pinky Promise 
Kamerkar is an investor and non-executive director in the Wharton incubated company Pinky Promise Pvt. Ltd.

See also 
 Bombay High Court
 Supreme Court of India
 National Company Law Tribunal

References

External links
 Bombay High Court Website
 Supreme Court of India Website
  NCLT Website

Living people
Indian lawyers
1990 births